Vivian Moreno is an American politician in San Diego, California. She currently serves as a San Diego City Councilmember representing City Council District 8.  She is a Democrat, although city council positions are officially nonpartisan per California state law.
 
District 8 includes the neighborhoods of Barrio Logan, Egger Highlands, Grant Hill, Logan Heights, Memorial, Nestor, Ocean View Hills, San Diego, Otay Mesa East,  Otay Mesa West, San Ysidro, Sherman Heights, Stockton, and the Tijuana River Valley.

References

External links 
 City of San Diego: Vivian Moreno website
 Moreno for City Council website

Living people
San Diego City Council members
University of California, San Diego alumni
Hispanic and Latino American people in California politics
Hispanic and Latino American politicians
Hispanic and Latino American women in politics
Year of birth missing (living people)
Women city councillors in California
21st-century American politicians
21st-century American women politicians
California Democrats